Government House, located in Adelaide on the corner of North Terrace and King William Road, is the official residence of the governor of South Australia.

History

The original "Government Hut" was a thatched hut constructed by the seamen of HMS Buffalo. Governor John Hindmarsh wrote in May 1837 "I have but one end of my mud hut finished and all my family lay on the floor of one room while two smaller ones serve for Mrs. H., myself and a female servant", When Lieutenant Colonel George Gawler replaced  Hindmarsh in 1838, he abandoned plans for a permanent house of timber and gave directions for the erection of a new building of masonry to cost £4,000 - if possible, but not to exceed £5,000. 

A plan had been obtained from an English architect, Edward O'Brien, but this was amended by George Strickland Kingston, who had come to South Australia as an assistant to the Surveyor General, William Light, and who had had some experience in architecture and building. When Kingston received tenders for the proposed work they were in the vicinity of £7,000. After further amendment of the plans to reduce the cost, a contract was let to the builders, Messrs East and Breeze. After Governor Gawler was recalled to England in 1841, partly because of his "extravagant" building programs, his successors George Grey and Lieutenant Colonel Frederick Holt Robe found it necessary to spend the least possible amount on the house.

The earliest part of the house to be built was the east wing of the present building. It was completed and occupied in May 1840. Government House is thus probably the second oldest continuously occupied house in the State, after Walkley cottage in St Mark's College, Pennington Terrace, North Adelaide, which was first occupied in mid-1839. When completed, Government House consisted of the present main drawing room, morning room, small dining room, and upstairs there were three bedrooms, a dressing room and two small servants' rooms. Governors, their families and house guests make use of all the upstairs rooms.

It was listed on the South Australian Heritage Register on 24 July 1980 and on the defunct Register of the National Estate on 21 March 1978.

The eastern Kintore Avenue boundary of the grounds of Government House was stepped back by 10 metres during 2015–2016, to make way for the construction of the Anzac Centenary Memorial Walk connecting the National War Memorial on North Terrace to the Torrens Parade Ground. The walkway was completed in 2016.

Summer residences
Governors formerly used a summer residence in the Adelaide Hills to escape the heat of the Adelaide Plains. Two buildings were used for this purpose. The first of these, Old Government House, was built in what is now the Belair National Park in 1860. In 1880, this building was superseded by a larger residence at Marble Hill near Norton Summit, until it was destroyed in the Black Sunday bushfires of 1955. Subsequently, the Governor was not provided with a summer residence.

Functions
Government House is located in well-kept grounds which are periodically used for important public ceremonies, such as:
Presentation of Queen's Scout and Queen's Guide awards
Presentation of Year 12 Merit certificates
Presentation of Debating SA Awards 
Other non-profit functions

Arts
In 2019 a Government House Arts Residency program was instituted, with the inaugural recipient being Margaret Worth.

Flags

Until May 2022, there were three flag poles on the roof of Government House. From 27 May 2022, governor Frances Adamson had four new flag poles installed on the lawn, so that the Aboriginal flag and Torres Strait Islander flag could both be permanently flown for the first time at Government House, along with the Australian flag and South Australian flag. All of the newly-installed flags are visible from King William Street and North Terrace. The flag-raising ceremony took place at the start of National Reconciliation Week.

Environs
Cottages were built in the northern part of the grounds, originally for the butler (1928) and the chauffeur (1945). The grounds of Government House itself are surrounded by prominent public buildings, statues and memorials:
North Terrace, Adelaide
Jubilee 150 Walkway
Torrens Parade Ground
South African War Memorial (South Australia)
National War Memorial (South Australia)
State Library of South Australia
Parliament  of South Australia
Migration Museum, Adelaide

See also
Government Houses of Australia
Government Houses in the Commonwealth
Governors of South Australia

Notes

External links

Government House home page

Government of South Australia
Official residences in Australia
Adelaide

Houses in Adelaide
Neoclassical architecture in Australia
1840 establishments in Australia
South Australian Heritage Register
Adelaide Park Lands
South Australian places listed on the defunct Register of the National Estate